Hanna Olivia Marin is a fictional character created by Sara Shepard for the Pretty Little Liars book series, and later developed for the Freeform television series adaptation by I. Marlene King. The character has also appeared in the spin-off series Ravenswood.

One of the main protagonists of the franchise, Hanna is a formerly overweight girl who becomes a queen-bee after the disappearance of Alison DiLaurentis.

Hanna is portrayed by Ashley Benson in the television series.

Character in print 
Hanna is introduced in the first book as a popular and ruthless girl. She is described as an alluring young redhead, and occasionally is fighting with herself in order to keep her beauty. In early novels, the character is also written as bulimic.

Story lines 
Hanna is one of four primary protagonists in all sixteen of the Pretty Little Liars novels, starting with Pretty Little Liars. All four girls attend the same school.

Prior to the start 
Before Alison DiLaurentis disappeared, Hanna is shown as a shy girl with an eating disorder. She is best friends with Alison DiLaurentis along with Spencer Hastings, Aria Montgomery and Emily Fields. Like the other girls, Hanna and Alison had a secret between them: Alison witnessed Hanna purging with a toothbrush when she thinks she's overweight. During the last night of the 7th grade, while having a sleepover in Spencer's sister Melissa's barn, Alison disappeared. Years later, in the 9th grade, Hanna tried out for cheerleading, but didn't make it, since the cheerleaders considered her too fat and not pretty enough to be in the squad. Hanna and Mona Vanderwaal, a girl that Hanna and her friends used to make fun of for being dorky, decided to become skinny and pretty before the next year's cheerleading tryouts. They bonded and became pretty and popular, eventually deciding that cheerleading wasn't even cool enough to try out for. Hanna took over Alison's spot as the most popular girl after Alison's disappearance. Within that time, Hanna and Mona also became shoplifters.

Character on screen

Casting 
In December 2009, The Futon Critic confirmed the casting of Ashley Benson as Hanna Marin.

Relationships

Sean Ackard 
Hanna's relationship with Sean started before the first episode. She thought he was the love of her life after she became a popular girl, and he noticed her. She had to struggle with Sean's decision to not have sex yet and she doubts if he really likes her. Their relationship ends later, during a party where she passed the limits with him, and he got upset.

Caleb Rivers 
Hanna's first hook up with the bad-boy Caleb Rivers is in the first season when they developed feelings for each other and he took Hanna's virginity. This first hook up ended when Hanna discovered that Caleb was spying on her, and Jenna paid him to do it. However, in the second season, Hanna forgives him and they rekindle their relationship. In the third season, after "A" was revealed to be Mona, Hanna started visiting her in Radley Sanitarium, and a new stalker emerged, making Hanna lie to Caleb multiple times. Thus, Caleb broke up with her, saying that he was tired of all her lies. But, when Hanna told Caleb the truth behind the new "A," he forgives her. The relationship continues well during the rest of the third season, until the following season, when Hanna gets upset because Caleb had to leave Rosewood in order to find out what was going on in Ravenswood. Furthermore, when Caleb returns to Rosewood, they hook up once again. They broke up again sometime during the five-years-time jump that occurred in mid sixth-season finale. It is later revealed that they broke up because Hanna was working a lot, and they didn't spend a lot of time together. However, they kissed when Hanna was set as a trap for the new stalker. Later they got back together and   Although everything, Hanna is still in love with Caleb.

Travis Hobbs 
Hanna's first contact with Travis occurred when he went to the police department and testified that Hanna's mother didn't kill Darren Wilden; with the act, Hanna thanks him. Later, Hanna texts Travis asking for his help. He drives her and her friends home, and later he helps Hanna to clean up and she thanks him for everything. Hanna offers to pay him, but instead he holds her hand and the two share an intimate moment. Later, Hanna invites Travis over to play a pool game. He teaches her how to play and, later, they kiss. Travis then invites Hanna on a date, and, during the dinner, they talk and enjoy a lot, until Hanna gets a text from "A" and after telling him she had a great time, leaves an upset Travis. They started dating later. However, when Alison returns to Rosewood, Hanna became insecure, and she forgets that she had plans to go to the Grille with Travis. He surprises her by knocking on her door and she apologizes for forgetting, and tells him that Alison is inside her home. She alleges that she would call him after Alison leaves, but she didn't do it, upsetting Travis, who, in the next morning, broke up with Hanna.

Jordan Hobart 
Jordan was Hanna's fiancée after the five-years time jump—which occurred during the mid-sixth season. He is described as a sophisticated-yet-approachable 27-year-old working in the fashion industry. Hanna and him first meet at a restaurant in New York, where Jordan asked to buy her a drink. However, Hanna turns down her engagement with Jordan on the seventh season, when she found herself unable to love him.

Rivalries and friendships 
Hanna is known in the first season for her jealousy of Amber Victorino, a girl who gave Sean rides to school after Hanna crashed Sean's car. In the fourth season, Hanna also had a rivalry with Miranda, a girl who Caleb wanted to help when he decided to move to Ravenswood.

Hanna is the best friend of Spencer, Aria, Alison, Emily and Mona. —the Liars—, well as being friend of, Lucas Gottesman, Ezra Fitz, Wren Kingston, Toby Cavanaugh, and Paige McCullers.

Story lines

Season 1 
The former overweight girl is now the "it girl" of Rosewood High School. Along with her new best friend, Mona Vanderwaal, she rules the school and they are clearly labeled under the title of "queen-bees." Shoplifting gives her a Bad girl feel but when she is caught, Hanna struggles with the fact that her mother, Ashley, is the main factor of the removal of her charges—Ashley maintained a sexual relationship with Officer Darren Wilden in order to keep clean the image of her family. In addition, the old group of friends, in which Hanna was a member in the ninth grade, reunite, causing tension between her friendship with Mona. Hanna also has to deal with the threats and the danger of possibly having her secrets revealed by the tenebrous "A." Also in this season, Hanna starts a romantic relationship with the bad-boy Caleb Rivers.

Season 2 
After suffering with Caleb's betrayal, Hanna now has to decide if she'll be able to forgive him, or just let him go. Meanwhile, Hanna has to struggle with the marriage between her father, Tom, and her soon-to-be step-mother, Isabel. Her friendships Aria, Emily and Spencer grow — angering Mona, who thinks that maybe she has lost her friendship with Hanna. Hanna ultimately forgives Caleb, and they reunite. In order to find out who is "A," the girls ask Caleb for help, and Hanna worries about it. The season ends with Hanna finding out that Mona is the person behind the anonymous "A."

Season 3 
Hanna is trying to overcome Mona's betrayal, and she decides to visit her at the Radley Sanitarium in order to get some answers. Hanna's relationship with Caleb keeps going, until they break up when Caleb gets tired of Hanna's lies—principally when she covers up her visits to Mona. Plus, Hanna gets closer to Wren Kingston, but she avoids a possible relationship. Hanna is also accused of stealing Alison's body by Officer Wilden. Caleb and Hanna hook up once again when he finds out that a new "A" emerged recently.

Season 4 
After the events of the third-season finale, Hanna and the girls now have Mona on their side. Meanwhile, Hanna starts to suspect that her mother may have killed Officer Wilden. On Halloween, the girls connect in Ravenswood, a town next to Rosewood. Hanna and Caleb's relationship ends when Hanna decides that Caleb should know what's behind his past in Ravenswood. Hanna's relationship with the girls is growing stronger and stronger with each tragedy. In the season finale, Hanna and the girls find out that Alison is still alive.

Ravenswood

Season 5 
With Alison's return to Rosewood, Hanna struggles with her identity and individuality. Determined to be her own person, Hanna gets a makeover. Her insecurities are not helped when Caleb returns to Rosewood, with secrets of his own, and the pair begin drinking. Hanna's drinking causes a rift between her and her friends, especially Aria, when Ella's—Aria's mother— fiancée hits on her. When Caleb finally opens up to Hanna, things between them get back to normal. Hanna is deeply affected by Mona's apparent death. Being accepted into her choice of colleges, Hanna scrambles to collect enough money when her father refuses to pay for her education. Desperate, and at a loss of other options, Hanna enrolls in a beauty pageant for the cash prize, only to fail miserably. Hanna also deals with her mother's infidelity, while trying to foil "A'"s attempts to frame her for Mona's murder. "A" finally succeeds in putting Hanna behind bars as an accomplice to Mona's murder. She, along with the other girls, are being transported to prison when they are abducted and held captive by "A" in a species of house for hostages.

Season 6 
Following the events in which 'A' kidnapped Hanna and her friends on their way to the prison and imprisoned them in the Dollhouse, Hanna is showing symptoms of posttraumatic stress disorder, and she relieves herself through anger. After a collapse, she destroys her bedroom and temporarily breaks up with Caleb; plus, she does not want to be overly-protected anymore and decides to find out once and for all who "A" really is. She starts investigating with Spencer, and gets a list of suspects. However, none of her suspects is the real one. The second person behind "A'" mask is revealed to be CeCe Drake. Afterwards, she graduates and moves to New York City with Caleb, who pays her fee for NY Fashion Institute of Technology. Hanna embarks into a life that focuses on fashion shows, in which Caleb doesn't seem to fit. These fights drive them apart, and they break up once again. Years later, Hanna, along with her friends, returns to Rosewood. She is now engaged to Jordan and Caleb is dating Spencer, thus letting Hanna uncertain and confused, since she still has feelings for her former boyfriend. With her wedding plans moving forward, she questions again if her fiancé is the right decision. As a new stalker is starting to get more dangerous, she and Caleb come up with a trap in which Hanna represents the bait. Knowing the risks, she admits her true feelings for Caleb, and they kiss. The plan goes awry, and Hanna is abducted by the mysterious "A.D." The season ends up with Hanna being unconsciously dragged in the church, her state being left unknown.

Season 7

Pretty Little Liars: The Perfectionists 

It was revealed after the 3rd episode that Hanna and Caleb had a baby boy named Aidan.

References

External links 
 Hanna Marin on IMDb

Pretty Little Liars characters
Literary characters introduced in 2006
Characters in American novels of the 21st century
Female characters in literature
American female characters in television
Fictional alcohol abusers
Crossover characters in television
Fictional characters with bulimia
Fictional thieves
Female characters in television
Teenage characters in television
Teenage characters in literature
Fictional characters with eating disorders
Television characters introduced in 2010
Fictional fashion designers